Blazing Across the Pecos is a 1948 American Western film directed by Ray Nazarro and written by Norman S. Hall. The film stars Charles Starrett, Patricia Barry, Paul Campbell, Charles C. Wilson, Thomas E. Jackson, Red Arnall and Smiley Burnette. The film was released on July 1, 1948, by Columbia Pictures.

Plot
Businessman Ace Brockway and his henchmen are secretly arming hostile Indians with rifles to attack wagon trains. Brockway has such contempt for the law and the people that he employs the buffoon restaurant owner Smiley Burnette as town marshal and Jim Traynor to run the newspaper, printing only what Brockway tells him to. The Durango Kid becomes Burnette's deputy and brings law and order to the West.

Cast          
Charles Starrett as Steve Blake aka The Durango Kid
Patricia Barry as Lola Carter
Paul Campbell as Jim Traynor
Charles C. Wilson as Ace Brockway 
Thomas E. Jackson as Matt Carter 
Red Arnall as Guitar Player
Smiley Burnette as Smiley Burnette
Jack Ingram as 'Buckshot' Thomas
Chief Thundercloud as Chief Bear Claw
Pat O'Malley as Mike Doyle
Jock Mahoney as Bill Wheeler
Frank McCarroll as Gunsmoke Ballard
Pierce Lyden as Jason
Paul Conrad as Sleepy Larsen

References

External links
 

1948 films
1940s English-language films
American Western (genre) films
1948 Western (genre) films
Columbia Pictures films
Films directed by Ray Nazarro
American black-and-white films
1940s American films